The Madurai Junction–Chennai Egmore Superfast Express or Mahal Superfast Express is a Superfast Express train belonging to Indian Railways – Southern Railway zone that runs between  and  in India.

It operates as train number 22624 from Madurai Junction to Chennai Egmore and as train number 22623 in the reverse direction, serving the state of Tamil Nadu. It shares its rakes with 12651/12652 Tamil Nadu Sampark Kranti Express. From April 2021, it runs with brand new LHB rakes.

Coaches

The 22624 / 23 Mahal Superfast Express presently has 
 1 AC 2 tier
 2 AC 3 tier 
 8 Sleeper class 
 4 General Unreserved
 2 EOG (End-On Generator)

As with most train services in India, coach composition may be amended at the discretion of Indian Railways depending on demand.

Timings

22624 Madurai Junction–Chennai Egmore Superfast Express departs Madurai Junction every Thursday & Saturday at 20.50 and reaches Chennai Egmore at 06.55 the next day.
In return, 22623 Chennai Egmore–Madurai Junction leaves Chennai Egmore every Friday & Sunday at 22.05 and reaches Madurai Junction at 08.10 the next day.

Routeing

Traction

As the route is yet to be electrified, it is hauled end-to-end by a Diesel Loco Shed, Tondiarpet-based WDM-3A/WDG-3A locomotive.

References

External links

Transport in Madurai
Transport in Chennai
Express trains in India
Rail transport in Tamil Nadu